Govabhai Hamirabhai Rabari is an Indian politician from the state of Gujarat. He was a former MLA in Deesa constituency from Gujarat. He belongs to Indian National Congress party.
Govabhai Rabari is a politician in North Gujarat. He is Gujarat Pradesh Congress Vice President of Gujarat.

References

Gujarat MLAs 2012–2017
1954 births
Living people
Indian National Congress politicians from Gujarat